Montiaceae are a family of flowering plants, comprising about 14 genera with about 230 known species, ranging from small herbaceous plants to shrubs. The family has a cosmopolitan distribution.

The family Montiaceae was newly adopted in the APG III system and includes members of the Caryophyllales formerly listed in Portulacaceae.

Genera
Calandrinia Kunth
Calyptridium Nutt.
Cistanthe Spach
Claytonia L.
Hectorella Hook.f.
Lenzia Phil.
Lewisia Pursh
Lewisiopsis Govaerts
Lyallia Hook.f.
Montia L.
Montiopsis Kuntze
Parakeelya Hershk.
Phemeranthus Raf.
Schreiteria Carolin

References

External links
 
 

 
Caryophyllales families
Taxa named by Constantine Samuel Rafinesque